Sainte-Euphémie is a municipality of 350 people in the Montmagny Regional County Municipality within the Chaudière-Appalaches region of Quebec.

See also
 List of municipalities in Quebec

References

Municipalities in Quebec
Incorporated places in Chaudière-Appalaches